Frederic Walker (4 December 1829 – 20 December 1889) was an English cricketer.

Walker was born in Southgate, Middlesex and was the third of seven cricket playing brothers – the Walkers of Southgate. He was educated at Trinity College, Cambridge. He played first-class cricket as a right-handed batsman and wicketkeeper for Cambridge University (1849-1852), Marylebone Cricket Club (MCC) (1853-1856) and a Middlesex XI in 1859. He died in Arnos Grove, aged 60.

References

External links 
 Frederic Walker at Cricinfo
 Frederic Walker at Cricket Archive

1829 births
1889 deaths
Alumni of Trinity College, Cambridge
Cambridge University cricketers
English cricketers
Middlesex cricketers
People from Southgate, London
Marylebone Cricket Club cricketers
Gentlemen cricketers
Gentlemen of the South cricketers
Frederic
Cricketers from Greater London
Gentlemen of Marylebone Cricket Club cricketers